Busler is a surname. Notable people with the surname include:

Ray Busler (1914–1969), American football player
Rudolf Busler (fl. 1950–1979), German news photographer and cinematographer

See also
Husler